The Algeria U-20 women's national football team represents Algeria in international women's football for under 20. The team plays its home games at the Omar Hamadi Stadium in Algiers and is coached by Azzedine Chih. Algeria played its first match on April 2, 2006 against Liberia, and lost 2–3.

Results and fixtures
The following is a list of match results in the last 12 months, as well as any future matches that have been scheduled.

Legend

2023

Players

Current squad
 The following players were called up for the 2023 UNAF U-20 Women's Tournament held in Le Kram, Tunis, Tunisia.
 Match dates: 14, 16 and 18 March 2023
 Opposition: ,  and 

Head coach: Rachid Aït Mohamed

Competitive record

FIFA U-20 Women's World Cup record

African U-20 Women's World Cup qualification record

UNAF U-20 Women's Tournament

See also
Algeria women's national football team
Algeria women's national under-17 football team

References

 
National
Youth football in Algeria
Arabic women's national under-20 association football teams
African women's national under-20 association football teams